Churchill Downs is a horse racing complex located on Central Avenue in south Louisville, Kentucky, United States, famed for hosting the annual Kentucky Derby. It officially opened in 1875 and was named for Samuel Churchill, whose family was prominent in Kentucky for many years. The first Kentucky Derby, a Thoroughbred sweepstakes and part of today's horse racing Triple Crown, and the first Kentucky Oaks were held in the same year.  Churchill Downs has also hosted the renowned Breeders' Cup on nine occasions, most recently on November 2 and 3, 2018. 

The racetrack is owned and operated by Churchill Downs Incorporated. With the infield open for the Kentucky Derby, the capacity of Churchill Downs is roughly 170,000. 

In 2009 the Horseplayers Association of North America introduced a rating system for 65 Thoroughbred racetracks in North America, which ranked Churchill Downs number 5 on its list.

In 2014, prior to the start of their spring meet, Churchill Downs announced an increase in parimutuel takeout rates. As a result of the takeout increase, Churchill Downs ranked number 22 in that year's Horseplayers Association of North America Track Ratings.

History

The track is named for John and Henry Churchill, who leased  of land to their nephew, Colonel Meriwether Lewis Clark Jr. (grandson of explorer William Clark). Clark was president of the Louisville Jockey Club and Driving Park Association, which formed in 1875. His father-in-law, Richard Ten Broeck, was an accomplished horse breeder and trainer, and introduced Clark to horse racing, attending the English Derby at Epsom Downs outside London. 

Churchill Downs filled a void in Louisville left by the closing of Oakland and Woodlawn, two earlier race courses. The then-rural location was along Louisville and Nashville Railroad tracks, allowing for easy transport of horses. Clark, who preferred longer races to the relatively short ones that had become popular by the 1890s, was running short of funds, and in 1894 sold the track to a syndicate led by William E. Applegate. The new ownership would soon institute many changes, such as commissioning the famous twin spire grandstand in 1895, shortening the length of the signature race to its modern  in 1896, and adorning the winner of the Derby with a garland of roses, a tradition that also began in 1896.

In early 1902, Applegate, who had made his fortune as a bookmaker, turned over the day-to-day operation of the track to Charles F. Grainger, then the mayor of Louisville, in an effort to move Churchill Downs away from being primarily known for gambling. Among the new people Applegate brought on board to help him run the rack was Col. Matt Winn of Louisville. Churchill Downs prospered and the Kentucky Derby then became the preeminent stakes race for three-year-old thoroughbred horses in North America.

During that early period, a new clubhouse was built in order to promote social interaction, and new events such as steeplechases, automobile races, and band concerts were held at the track. The State Fair was held on the grounds, featuring the odd spectacle of two locomotives being intentionally crashed head-on in the infield.

On June 5, 1907, African American jockey James Lee set a record that has never been beaten when he won the entire six-race card at Churchill Downs.

In 1908, parimutuel betting machines were introduced as gambling began to be less controversial again, and the wagering portion of the track's business became more profitable.

Churchill Downs was designated a National Historic Landmark in 1986.

On Friday, June 19, 2009, Churchill Downs hosted its first-ever night race with an attendance of over 27,000.

Churchill Downs ventured into the music business, organizing the inaugural HullabaLOU Music Festival, held on the weekend of July 23–25, 2010. The track had planned to make this an annual event to compete with other summer music festivals. HullabaLOU attracted 78,000 people but that fell short of the more than 100,000 expected by the company. The company attributed this to the brutal heat, but others cited high ticket prices in a poor economy. The entertainment division lost more than $5 million int its first year and was discontinued.

On Wednesday, June 22, 2011, an EF2 tornado hit the Louisville area, striking the stables and chapel at Churchill Downs, at EF1 intensity.  Several stables were badly damaged, as was the chapel. Over 200 horses had to be evacuated from the damaged stables and be relocated to other stables that were not damaged by the tornado. The tornado did not cause any damage to the twin spires or the clubhouse.

Thurby is a portmanteau for Thursday plus Derby, and this name for the Thursday racing in Derby week has been recognized by Churchill Downs since 2014.

Graded events
 
The following Graded events will be held at Churchill Downs in 2022.

Grade I 

 Arlington Million
 Beverly D. Stakes
 Churchill Downs Stakes
 Clark Handicap
 Derby City Distaff Stakes
 Kentucky Derby
 La Troienne Stakes
 Kentucky Oaks
 Turf Classic Stakes

Grade II
 
 Alysheba Stakes
 American Turf Stakes
 Churchill Distaff Turf Mile Stakes
 Edgewood Stakes
 Eight Belles Stakes
 Falls City Handicap
 Fleur de Lis Stakes
 Golden Rod Stakes
 Kentucky Jockey Club Stakes
 Mrs. Revere Stakes
 Pat Day Mile Stakes
 Secretariat Stakes
 Stephen Foster Stakes
 Twin Spires Turf Sprint Stakes
 Wise Dan Stakes

Grade III
 
 Ack Ack Stakes
 Arlington Stakes
 Bashford Manor Stakes
 Cardinal Handicap
 Chicago Stakes
 Chilukki Stakes
 Commonwealth Turf Stakes
 Dogwood Stakes
 Iroquois Stakes
 Louisville Stakes
 Lukas Classic Stakes
 Matt Winn Stakes
 Mint Julep Handicap
 Modesty Stakes
 Pocahontas Stakes
 Pucker Up Stakes
 Regret Stakes
 River City Handicap
 Winning Colors Stakes

Chief Executive Officers 
From 1875 through 2019 Churchill Downs has had twelve CEOs.
 M. Lewis Clark 1875–1894
 William F. Schulte 1895–1901
 Charles F. Grainger 1902–1917
 Johnson N. Camden Jr. 1918–1927
 Samuel Culbertson 1928–1937
 Matt Winn 1938–1949
 Bill Corum 1950–1958
 Wathen Knebelkamp 1959–1970
 Lynn Stone 1970–1984
 Thomas H. Meeker 1984–2006
 Robert L. Evans 2006–2014
 William C. Carstanjen 2014–present

Facilities

The twin spires atop the grandstands are the most recognizable architectural feature of Churchill Downs and are used as a symbol of the track and the Derby. They were designed by architect Joseph Dominic Baldez and built in 1895. The usual number of people seated at the derby is 50,000 people, though crowds can reach over 150,000 on Derby day.

From 2001 to 2005, Churchill Downs underwent a three-and-a-half year, $121 million renovation. The clubhouse was replaced, 79 luxury suites were added, and the historic twin spires were refurbished. One of the additions in the clubhouse was a  mural by Pierre Bellocq depicting all 96 jockeys to win the Kentucky Derby from 1875 to 2004. In summer 2008 the same artist added another mural depicting all of the trainers and updating the Jockey's painting, adding Calvin Borel and Edgar Prado to it. These updates are done yearly to accommodate new winning trainers and jockeys. The new design has been somewhat controversial since the new suites block full view of the spires from most angles.

Racing at Churchill Downs occurs in three meets though for the majority of its existence there were only two meets per year. The spring meet starts one week before the Derby and continues until early July. The Kentucky Derby is held the first Saturday in May and the Kentucky Oaks is run on the Friday before the Derby. A fall meet picks up in late October and closes Thanksgiving weekend in late November. A third meet in September was added in 2013.

In addition to the track, clubhouse and stables, Churchill Downs also contains the Kentucky Derby Museum which focuses on the history of the Kentucky Derby and Churchill Downs. The museum also contains a number of exhibits exploring the training and racing of thoroughbred horses. It includes a 360-degree cinema that shows the short film "The Greatest Race", a documentary about the Kentucky Derby. The museum is normally open year-round.

In October 2013, Churchill Downs began installing a new, ultra high-definition video board built by Panasonic, which became operational in time for the 2014 Kentucky Derby. It was constructed along the outside of the backstretch of the dirt course facing the grandstand and infield. At the time, it was  the largest ultra high-definition video board ever constructed. At the same time, 750 speakers were installed around the track.

TV personalities
John Asher (1997–1998 the paddock show, CD Today a handicapping show 2007–2018)
Mike Battaglia (1997–2007 full-time, 2008–present as an occasional fill-in. Also the Tracks Morning Line Odds-Maker since 1974.)
Donna Barton Brothers (1999–2002)
Jill Byrne (2004–2007 fill-in, 2008–present full-time)
Jessica Pacheco (2007 Derby week)
Joanne Jones (2007 Derby Week)
 Joe Kristufek (2015–present full-time)

Track announcers
Gene Schmidt (1940–1960)
Chic Anderson (1961–1977)
Mike Battaglia (1978–1996, 2013 as a one-day fill-in, 2014 as a fill-in for Breeders Cup Weekend)
Kurt Becker (1997–1998)
Luke Kruytbosch (1999–2008)
Bobby Neuman (October 26 – November 2, 2008)
Michael Wrona (November 12–16, 2008)
John Asher (November 16, 2008)
Mark Johnson (November 26–29, 2008, 2009–2013)
Larry Collmus (November 19–23, 2008, 2014)
Bill Downes (2014 as a fill-in)
Travis Stone (November 5–9, 2008, 2015–present)

See also
List of attractions and events in the Louisville metropolitan area
List of graded stakes at Churchill Downs
Road to the Kentucky Derby
Road to the Kentucky Oaks
Kentucky Derby Festival
Kentucky Derby top three finishers
Kentucky Oaks top three finishers
Triple Crown of Thoroughbred Racing

Notes

References
Thomas, Samuel W. 1995. Churchill Downs:A Documentary History of America's Most Legendary Race Track
Schriener, Bruce. 2005. Historic track unveils $121 million facelift. Associated Press. April 28.

External links

Churchill Downs website
Churchill Downs Ticket Office
Kentucky Derby website
Kentucky Oaks website
Churchill Downs track page, NTRA

 
Horse racing venues in Kentucky
Kentucky culture
Kentucky Derby
National Register of Historic Places in Louisville, Kentucky
Tourist attractions in Louisville, Kentucky
Churchill Downs Incorporated
19th-century buildings and structures in Louisville, Kentucky
1875 establishments in Kentucky
National Historic Landmarks in Kentucky
Sports venues completed in 1875